Work experience is voluntary work by young people, often students. 

Work Experience may also refer to:

 Work Experience (film), a 1989 British short comedy film
 "Work Experience" (The Inbetweeners), an episode of the British sitcom The Inbetweeners
 "Work Experience" (The Office), an episode of the British sitcom The Office
 The Work Experience, a British comedy series
 Rhod Gilbert's Work Experience, a British comedy series